Philippe-Antoine Merlin, known as Merlin de Douai (30 October 1754 – 26 December 1838) was a French politician and lawyer.

Personal and public life

Early years
Merlin de Douai was born at Arleux, Nord, and was called to the Flemish bar association in 1775. He collaborated in the Répertoire de jurisprudence, the later editions of which appeared under Merlin's superintendence, and contributed to other important legal compilations. In 1782 he purchased a position as royal secretary at the chancellery of the Flanders parlement.  His reputation spread to Paris and he was consulted by leading magistrates.  The Duke of Orléans selected him to be a member of his privy council.

As an elected member of the States-General for the Third Estate in Douai, he was one of the chief of those who applied the principles of liberty and equality embodied in the National Constituent Assembly's Tennis Court Oath of 4 August 1789.

Career
On behalf of the committee, appointed to deal with Ancien Régime nobility rights, Merlin de Douai presented to the Assembly reports on manorialism and the subjects of redistribution with compensation, and topics associated with that (hunting and fishing rights, forestry, etc.). He carried legislation for the abolition of primogeniture, secured equality of inheritance between relatives of the same degree, and between men and women. He also prepared the report for the Assembly which argued that no compensation should be paid to the German princes whose lands in Alsace were forfeit when France incorporated them.

His numerous reports were supplemented by popular exposition of current legislation in the Journal de legislation. On the dissolution of the Assembly, he became judge of the criminal court at Douai.

Convention
Although not always an advocate of violent measures, as deputy to the National Convention with The Mountain, Merlin de Douai voted for the execution of King Louis XVI, and then, as a member of the council of legislation, he presented to the Convention the Law of Suspects (17 September 1793), permitting the detention of suspects, (a document backed by Georges Couthon and Maximilien Robespierre). He exercised missions in his native region, and accused General Charles François Dumouriez of having betrayed the country during the Campaign of the Low Countries (after the battle of Neerwinden).

Merlin de Douai was closely allied with his namesake Merlin of Thionville and, after the start of the Thermidorian Reaction which brought about the fall of Robespierre in 1794, he became president of the Convention and a member of the Committee of Public Safety. His efforts were primarily directed to the prevention of any new gathering of powers by the Jacobin Club, the Commune, and the Revolutionary Tribunal.

Merlin de Douai convinced the Committee of Public Safety to agree with the closing of the Jacobin Club, on the ground that it was an administrative rather than a legislative measure. Merlin de Douai recommended the readmission of the survivors of the Girondin party to the Convention, and drew up a law limiting the right of insurrection; he had also a considerable share in the foreign policy of the French Republic.

Merlin de Douai had been commissioned in April 1794 to report on the civil and criminal legislation of France, and, after eighteen months work, he produced the Rapport et projet de code des délits et des peines (10 Vendémiaire, an IV). Merlin's code abolished confiscation, branding, and life imprisonment, and was based chiefly on the penal code drawn up in September 1791.

Directory
He was made Minister of Justice (30 October 1795) and later Minister of the General Police (2 January 1796) under the Directory, before moving back to the Justice Ministry (3 April 1796) keeping tight surveillance of the Royalist émigrés. After the coup d'état known as 18 Fructidor, he became one of the five Directors on 5 September 1797. He was accused of the bankruptcy and various other failures of the government and was forced to retire into private life during the Coup of 30 Prairial VII on 18 June 1799.

Consulate and Empire
Merlin de Douai had no share in Napoleon Bonaparte's 18 Brumaire coup. Under the Consulate, Merlin de Douai accepted a minor position in the Cour de cassation, where he soon became procureur-général (Attorney General). Although he had no share in drawing up the Napoleonic code, he was very involved in matters regarding its application. He became a member of the Conseil d'État, Count of the Empire, and Grand Officier de la Légion d'honneur.

Exile and the July Monarchy
Having resumed his functions during the Hundred Days, he was one of those banished on the Second Bourbon Restoration.

The years of Merlin de Douai's exile were devoted to his Répertoire de jurisprudence (5th ed., 18 vols., Paris, 1827–1828) and to his Recueil alphabétique des questions de droit (4th ed., 8 vols., Paris, 1827–1828). At the 1830 July Revolution, he was able to return to France, and re-entered the Institut de France, of which he had been an original member, being admitted to the Academy of Political and Moral Sciences by the Orléans Monarchy. Merlin de Douai died in Paris.

Personal life
Merlin de Douai's son, Antoine François Eugène Merlin (1778–1854), was a well-known general in the French army, and served through most of the Napoleonic Wars.

See also
Pierre Marie François Ogé Sculptor of bust

Notes

References
 In turn, it gives the following reference:
François Auguste Alexis Mignet, Portraits et notices historiques (1852), vol. I

External links
Bio at the Académie française

1754 births
1838 deaths
People from Nord (French department)
Counts Merlin
Deputies to the French National Convention
Directeurs of the First French Republic
French jurists
17th-century French lawyers
Members of the Académie Française
Members of the Council of Ancients
Knights of the First French Empire
Grand Officiers of the Légion d'honneur
Members of the Académie des sciences morales et politiques
Expelled members of the Académie Française
People on the Committee of Public Safety
University of Douai alumni
Représentants en mission
Presidents of the National Convention
State ministers of France
Members of the Chamber of Representatives (France)